Wenzel Johann Scholz (Wenzislaus Johann, real name Wenzel von Plümeke) (28 March 1787 in Innsbruck, according to other sources Brixen – 5 October 1857 in Vienna) was an Austrian actor in Laibach, Klagenfurt, Graz and in Vienna above all ay the , who became known especially as brilliant partner of Johann Nestroy in his posses and s.

Origin 
In many biographies Maximilian Scholz (1744-1834) is mentioned as the father. His father, however, was the actor Leopold Scholz (1748-1826), who was possibly a brother or close relative of Maximilian. The error may result from the fact that both Scholz had a born Tilly as their wife.

Debut 
Scholz was an actor's child whose talent protested early against the forced profession of a merchant.

He made his debut in 1811 at the age of 24 in his mother's theatre troupe in the role of Harlequin in Friedrich Schiller's Turandot, Prinzessin von China and then appeared predominantly in Laibach and Klagenfurt. In March 1815 he was engaged for several weeks at the Hofburgtheater in Vienna, his debut was as Traugott in August von Kotzebue's play Bruderzwist oder die Versöhnung. Since his abilities were not recognized and he "soon felt the oppressiveness of the noble atmosphere", he became Kasperle, as his father proclaimed punitively. When Scholz realized that he was destined to be a comedian in the local business, he left the Burgtheater in September 1815 and gave a guest performance at the Theater in der Leopoldstadt. Since he was not engaged there despite good reviews, he returned to Klagenfurt, where he worked until 1819 mainly in batch and episode roles and as a young comedian, but great success already gave him some of his later Viennese shining roles. Scholz spent the next years with various theater troupes with whom he played in the Austrian provinces of Styria and Carinthia. In 1819 he succeeded in becoming an ensemble member at the theater in Graz for seven years, where he appeared as a comedian in Kasperle, Thaddädl and Staberl rolles.

In 1826 Scholz went again to Vienna at the age of 39 to fulfill an engagement at the Theater in der Josefstadt where his first role was Truffaldino in Goldoni's The Servant of Two Masters. From May 1827 he appeared at the Theater an der Wien and pleased audiences and critics as Staberl in Bäuerle's . In 1826 Scholz achieved the final breakthrough to the popular folk comedian in the role of Klapperle in Karl Meisl's Die schwarze Frau, a parody, in which he brought the audience to frenzy with a grotesquely drastic appearance with a bloated neck and "no voice" and according to contemporary witnesses after a nonsens-, he had to appear up to ten times on stage. His popularity "soon increased to worship" (Alexander von Weilen, Allgemeine Deutsche Biographie 1891).

Scholz and Nestroy 

Theatre director Carl Carl transferred Scholz to the Theater an der Wien, where he became the partner of Johann Nestroy from 1831. From 1832 to 1852 Scholz played at the Theater in der Leopoldstadt (from 1847 Carltheater). The many great successes of the famous duo came about because Nestroy wrote many roles for himself and his partner Scholz. Scholz's outward appearance, a stocky figure, a round, mostly motionless face with nimble, lively eyes and his mostly phlegmatic temperament, which stood in contrast to Nestroy, mainly contributed to the comic effect of his play. The combination Scholz/Nestroy can be compared with the famous double acts like Arlecchino and Pantalone in the Commedia dell’arte and later Karl Valentin and Liesl Karlstadt and also Laurel and Hardy.

In Nestroy's dialog drafts, the main characters are usually marked with N. and Sch, the initials of Nestroy and Scholz.

Especially for the roles of stupid, foolish servant, Scholz was made as a phlegmatic gardener's assistant in Nestroy's Der Talisman (1840) or as a domestic servant "Melchior" (a role that Nestroy had written for Scholz) in Einen Jux will er sich machen (1842), who stupidly repeats the sentence: "Das is’ klassisch!" In a review on 14 July 1842 of a guest performance of this play in Prague, it was said: 

Especially besides Nestroy's cutting irony, Scholz's original harmlessness was indispensable, he opposed the mercurial technique Treumann's with his good-natured calm. "Johann Nestroy and Wenzel Scholz seemed to have divided themselves into the inheritance of the Hanswurst: all sharpness and mobility fell to Nestroy, all width and comfort came to Scholz. Nestroy always had to achieve his success, Scholz had already won when he appeared. Scholz was a representative of the responsible, tolerating, Nestroy a representative of the active, the attacking comedy" (Speidel).

The play Eulenspiegel oder Schabernack über Schabernack was written by Nestroy in 1835 for his friend Scholz. It is remarkable that Nestroy did not play the title role himself, but chose a "fat one" for Eulenspiegel.

A humorous painting from 1848 shows Scholz and Nestroy as an "unequal 4848" National Guard pair, a militia set up by the revolutionaries in Vienna at the beginning of the 1848 Revolution. The picture was an allusion to the political intermezzo of Nestroy during the Revolution, which was reflected in his farce with the song , which had the events of the March Revolution as background and in which Nestroy and Scholz appeared together.

Nestroy's farce in one act Die Fahrt mit dem Dampfwagen was premiered on 5 December 1834 at the Theater an der Wien for the benefit of his friend Scholz.

Vis Comica 

In his comedy, Scholz was the last representative of a naive burlesque comedy following Hanswurst. It was not until Scholz's late period that the drastic comic means were reduced in favor of a stronger internalization and psychological deepening, as in the role of the idealistic country doctor Gabriel Brunner in Nestroy's late work Kampl (1852), who wants to bring matters of love and inheritance from the high nobility to the locksmith into balance with brilliant one-line jokes, metaphors and raisonnements and as an ordering authority fights on the side of loyalty and good character.

Despite his obesity, Scholz had a high degree of agility at his disposal. Contemporaries report of a daring leap, a pirouette, which Scholz still performed at an advanced age in Nestroy's farce Der Unbedeutende and which prompted the audience to ovations and applause.

The Viennese court actor Karl Ludwig Costenoble wrote about Scholz: " The man has an unspeakable power! He can repeat the most bland things three and four times - they never get boring, on the contrary, he recites one and the same idea or remark so differently in his keys that the laughter is always increased". In his genre Scholz was unequalled until an equal successor was found in Josef Matras.

On 28 March 1856 the anonymous one-act play Wenzel Scholz und Die chinesische Prinzessin was performed in the Carl-Theater on the occasion of his 70th birthday. Scholz searched in vain for an author to write a play for him and received a package containing only empty sheets. With the help of a few bottles of wine to "inspire" him, he decided to write the play himself and fell asleep over it. The dream led him to China, where he was to marry a princess and, exposed as a comedian, lose his life. Just in time he woke up and had the material he was looking for.

This one-act play is testimony to the collaboration of the famous comedian quartet Johann Nestroy, Wenzel Scholz, Karl Treumann and Alois Grois at the Carltheater at a turning point from the comedy of the farcical , which ended with Scholz, to the 'new' comedy after 1850 on the way to operette.

Karl Haffner made Scholz the hero of a drama (Wenzel Scholz, a genre picture from the life of an artist with song and dance in three acts, 1858) and a folk novel.

Private life 
Scholz has been married twice. From the first marriage with Antonia Rupp, daughter of a printer, came two sons Eduard (d. 1844 at the age of 34), Anton (d. 1846, suicide) and two daughters Josephine Leeb and Karoline von Franck (married to Alfred Ritter von Franck), both of whom started a mediocre acting career. The marriage is not said to have been a happy one, as his wife was a squanderer. Six years later, after the death of his first wife in 1844, Scholz married Therese Miller for the second time at an advanced age. This second marriage remained childless. An illegitimate child Scholz' is verifiable.

Privately, Scholz was serious and taciturn and only devoted to tobacco smoking and card game, where he regularly lost, but with great equanimity, although it plunged him into great financial hardship. Director Carl Carl knew how to cleverly compense Scholz's financial calamities by advances, loans, purchase of his benefit ideas etc. Only under Nestroy's direction did Scholz receive a corresponding remuneration.

Scholz was the only one whom director Carl Carl considered in his will with a considerable sum as a pension. Nevertheless, this denied him the wish to participate in the k.k. Burgtheater, which at that time meant the culmination of an acting career.

At the age of 70 Scholz died after a short illness. Contemporary witnesses report of enormous participation in the funeral, tens of thousands of Viennese are said to have given him the Funeral Procession to the old Friedhof in Dornbach, hundreds of staff followed the coffin. Johann Nestroy, his friend and partner of many years, travelled, however, not to have to attend the funeral, since he could not bear the thought of death. In 1900 Scholz's body was exhumed at the instigation of his granddaughter and reburied in Traunkirchen.

Scholz is immortalized on the safety curtain of the Theater an der Wien next to Nestroy, Raimund and Mozart's The Magic Flute.

Bibliography 
 Carl Haffner, Adolf Müller (Music): Wenzl Scholz. Skizzen aus dem Künstlerleben mit Gesang in drei Akten. Sommer (Druck), Wien 1859. – Read online.
 Karl Haffner: Scholz und Nestroy. Roman aus dem Künstlerleben. Drei Bände. Markgraf, Wien 1866 (Digitalisat volume 1, volume 2, volume 3)
 Constantin von Wurzbach: Scholz, Wenzel. In Biographisches Lexikon des Kaiserthums Oesterreich. 31. Theil. Kaiserlich-königliche Hof- und Staatsdruckerei, Wien 1876, 
 
 J. Seyfried: Wenzel Scholz. In: Paul Wertheimer (publisher): Alt-Wiener Theater. Schilderungen von Zeitgenossen. Knepler, Wien 1920, .
 Carl Haffner: Nestroy und Scholz. Zwei von Humor. Ein Stück Wiener Theatergeschichte um Nestroy und Scholz. Göth, Wien 1946.
 Ursula Deck: Wenzel Scholz und das Alt-Wiener Volkstheater. Ein Beitrag zur Geschichte der Wiener Volkskomik. Dissertation. Universität Wien, Wien 1968.
 
 Jürgen Hein (publisher): Wenzel Scholz und Die chinesische Prinzessin. Quodlibet, volume 5, . Lehner, Wien 2003, .
 
 Vlasta Reittererová: Wenzel Scholz (1797–1857) – ein Wiener Komiker in Prag, .

References

External links 
 Wenzel Scholz on Wien Geschischte Wiki

1787 births
1857 deaths
Actors from Innsbruck
Austrian male stage actors
19th-century Austrian male actors